The 1884 United States presidential election in Arkansas took place on November 4, 1884. All contemporary 38 states were part of the 1884 United States presidential election. Arkansas voters chose seven electors to the Electoral College, which selected the president and vice president.

Arkansas voted for the Democratic nominee, Grover Cleveland, over the Republican nominee, James G. Blaine by a margin of 17.12%.

Results

See also
 United States presidential elections in Arkansas

References

Arkansas
1884
1884 Arkansas elections